Safijova is a village in Grodno District of the Grodno Region of Belarus, close to the Belarus–Poland border. It is a part of Padlabieńnie Rural Council. In 1999 it had a population of 45 and in 2010 the number decreased to 9. Lipszczany is a village located in the Polish side of the border. There is a plan to open a border crossing between Belarus and Poland next to the village.

References

Villages in Belarus
Białystok Voivodeship (1919–1939)
Belastok Region
Belarus–Poland border crossings
Grodno District
Populated places in Grodno Region